Château Laroque is a Bordeaux wine which has the appellation Saint-Émilion, ranked Grand cru classé in the Classification of Saint-Émilion wine. The winery is located in the Right Bank of France’s Bordeaux wine region  in the department Gironde.

History

Chateau Laroque dates back to the 12th century. The chateau itself was constructed in the 17th century and remains a backdrop for the manicured grounds.  The vineyards were all replanted in 1962 and where inactive for sometime after the Great Depression.

Production

The classified vineyard area extends 40 hectares, with the grape varieties of approximately 87% Merlot, 11% Cabernet Franc and 2% Cabernet Sauvignon.

References

Bordeaux wine